Dundurn Castle is a historic neoclassical mansion on York Boulevard in Hamilton, Ontario, Canada. The  house took three years and $175,000 to build, and was completed in 1835.  
The forty-room castle featured the latest conveniences of gas lighting and running water.  It is currently owned by the City of Hamilton, which purchased it in 1899 or 1900 for $50,000. The city has spent nearly $3 million renovating the site to make it open to the public.  The rooms have been restored to the year 1855 when its owner Sir Allan Napier MacNab, 1st Baronet, was at the height of his career. Costumed interpreters guide visitors through the home, illustrating daily life from the 1850s. The Queen of Canada, a descendant of Sir Allan MacNab, is the Royal Patron of Dundurn Castle.

History
Dundurn Castle, a Regency house, was completed in 1835 by architect Robert Charles Wetherell. MacNab purchased the property from Richard Beasley, one of Hamilton's early settlers, when financial difficulties forced Beasley to sell lands at Burlington Heights (present day Dundurn Park), and MacNab built Dundurn Castle on the foundations of Beasley's brick home.  Once built, Dundurn Castle became famous all over the country for its grand entertainments. Sir John A. Macdonald and King Edward VII are among those who have been entertained there.

Sir Allan MacNab, later Premier of the united Province of Canada between 1854 and 1856, hired architect Robert Wetherall and construction of this stately home was completed in 1835. The pillars and portico were added in 1855 as part of the preparations for the wedding of MacNab's daughter Sophia.

After MacNab's death, the estate was used as an institution for deaf mutes, then was purchased in 1872 by Donald McInnes, who sold Dundurn to the City of Hamilton in 1899. On June 1, 1928, the Hamilton Aviary at Dundurn Castle was opened to the public. In the late 1960s, Dundurn Castle was restored as a Centennial project. It is now designated as a National Historic Site of Canada. In 1996, the Aviary was relocated to Churchill Park in Westdale.

A Strathspey for bagpipes was composed in honour of Dundurn Castle.

Hamilton Military Museum
The park includes Hamilton Military Museum, which is housed in an outbuilding which was relocated when York Street was widened as York Boulevard in the 1970s.  Displays include the War of 1812, the Rebellions of 1837, the Boer War, World War I, World War II and the role of women in the military.  Artifacts include uniforms, medals, weapons, photographs and other military memorabilia.  The museum also features a library with materials about Canadian military history, which is open by appointment.

Grounds

Dundurn Castle operates as a civic museum, and its grounds house other attractions. Dundurn Park and its associated green spaces are favourites for wedding portraits. The Cockpit Theatre occasionally housed outdoor events and dramas.

A large German artillery piece, booty from the First World War, was removed from the southeastern part of the park in the mid-1980s.  Until about 1990, it housed an aviary which was moved to the Westdale neighbourhood. The former covered pavilion offered picnickers protection from the cold, but in the last few years a walled garden was put in its place. The gates at the front entrance of the park originally came from England, but the stone pillars were cut from the Dundas mountain. In 1931, parts of the gates were removed and taken to the Chedoke Golf Club.

Dundurn Park has its own folly, just east of the castle. Living up to its purpose, it had confused some people who had considered it a theatre, a laundry, a boat-house, a buttery, an office, a chapel for Sir Allan's Roman Catholic wife, or even a cockfighting ring, although no proof of the last use has ever been found. Urban legend has it that many tunnels were built, leading from the Castle to various parts of the estate and one of the entrances was through the folly.

Sir Allan Napier MacNab was originally buried in 1862 on the Dundurn Park grounds between Dundurn Castle and Castle Dean on the corner of Locke Street and Tecumseh Street. In 1909, his body was removed and taken to Holy Sepulchre Cemetery in west Hamilton. His grave was unmarked until 1967, when the Canadian Club of Hamilton placed a bench and grave marker.

A 360-degree curved plaque was unveiled at Fieldcote Museum in Ancaster on July 20, 2014, marking the 200th anniversary of the most important and largest mass hanging in Canadian history, the execution of nine men convicted of treason during the War of 1812. This event is known locally as The Bloody Assize. The men were taken from York, then capital of Upper Canada, and executed near present-day Inchbury Street at the eastern end of Dundurn Park. Their burial place nearby has not yet been discovered by archaeological research.

A large garden is cultivated near the eastern edge of the park. The produce is used in the castle's kitchen, and the excess is donated to a local food bank. Tours of the castle end in the kitchen, where samples of cuisine of the era are offered to tourists.

See also
List of attractions in Hamilton, Ontario
Ravenscrag House, Montreal
List of castles in Canada

References

External links
"Dundurn Castle", Culture and Recreation, Hamilton

Castles in Canada
Museums in Hamilton, Ontario
Houses in Ontario
National Historic Sites in Ontario
Historic house museums in Ontario
Military and war museums in Canada
Neoclassical architecture in Canada
Designated heritage properties in Ontario
1835 establishments in Canada
Reportedly haunted locations in Ontario